Snobs is a nightclub in Birmingham, England. It is located on Smallbrook Queensway at the corner of Hurst Street. The club was founded 50 years ago in 1972, and has been visited by over 2.5 million people during its time.

Snobs primarily plays music within the genres of Indie rock, Rock and roll, retro, and Indie pop.

It was announced in August 2014 that the club will host its final night at the current venue on Sunday 21 September 2014, ahead of its £2 million relocation to a larger venue in Ringway Centre on Smallbrook Queensway which will hold 1,400 people.

References

External links 
 
 Snobs' Twitter feed

Nightclubs in Birmingham, West Midlands